Allan Belcher (2 December 1884 – 2 July 1921) was an Australian rules footballer who played with and coached Essendon in the Victorian Football League (VFL). He was the brother of South Melbourne player Vic Belcher.

Belcher started his career with Collingwood but it was with Essendon that he established himself as one of the premier ruckmen in the league. Known as "King Belcher" formed a combination in the ruck with Fred Baring and Ernie Cameron, culminating in premiership success in 1912.

He was captain-coach of Essendon in 1910 and represented Victoria at interstate football in patches during his career. From 1912 to 1915 he captained the club and again in 1919 but it would be his final season, a broken toe forcing him to retire.

On 2 July 1921 – just two years after his last VFL game – Belcher succumbed to general paralysis in the Kew Hospital for the Insane. His once-robust frame had wasted away to just 57 kg by the time of his passing.

References

External links

1884 births
1921 deaths
Australian rules footballers from Melbourne
Australian Rules footballers: place kick exponents
Essendon Football Club players
Essendon Football Club Premiership players
Essendon Football Club coaches
Collingwood Football Club players
Brunswick Football Club players
One-time VFL/AFL Premiership players
Australian rules footballers from Tasmania
People from Brunswick, Victoria